Taphrognathus is an extinct genus of conodonts from the Dinantian (Lower Carboniferous).

Synonyms 
In 1947 the name Taphrognathus was also used to describe a prehistoric amphibian from the Middle Triassic of Arizona, but the amphibian was renamed Hadrokkosaurus in 1957 after the synonymy was realized.

See also

References 

Ozarkodinida genera
Carboniferous fish of North America
Mississippian conodonts
Fossil taxa described in 1941
Taxa named by Edward Branson
Taxa named by Maurice Mehl